In Japan,  is a common place name which means Mt. Fuji is viewable. It may refer to:

Places in Japan
 Fujimi, Saitama, a city
 Fujimi, Nagano, a town
 Fujimi, Gunma, a village
 Fujimi, a subdivision within Chiyoda, Tokyo

Companies
 Fujimi Shobo, a Japanese publisher
 Fujimi Mokei, a Japanese plastic model manufacturer